Omid Harandi (born 14 March 1964 in Rasht, Iran) is an Iranian football coach and retired player who recently managed Damash Gilan in Iran Pro League. He was previously assistant coach of  Pegah Gilan for six years.

Playing career
He began his career as a football goalkeeper in 1980 with Naft Gilan. After two years, he joined to Sepidrood Rasht and played for the team for five years, then moved to Esteghlal Rasht and played eleven seasons in the club. He signed a two years contract with Niroye Zamini and retired at the end of his contract.

Managerial career
He was chosen as Esteghlal Rasht (then Pegah Gilan)'s assistant coach in 2001, one year after his retirement. He started his career with Nasser Hejazi and remained in the coaching staff of next coaches. He resigned in 2008. Four years after his resignation, he was appointed as Damash Gilan's head coach for the upcoming season and signed a one-year contract after talks with club president, Amir Abedini but he was fired after a 6-1 loss to Fajr Sepasi on 16 September 2012.

Managerial statistics

References

1964 births
Living people
Iranian footballers
Iranian football managers
Damash Gilan managers
Association football goalkeepers
People from Rasht
Sportspeople from Gilan province